It's a Wonderful Lie may refer to:

 "It's a Wonderful Lie" (House), an episode of House, M.D.
 "It's a Wonderful Lie", an episode of The Fresh Prince of Bel-Air
 "It's a Wonderful Lie", an episode of The Riches